Fozzy is an American heavy metal band formed in Atlanta, Georgia, in 1999 by lead singer Chris Jericho/Irvine, lead guitarist Rich Ward and drummer Frank Fontsere, who are the longest-serving members of the band and have appeared on all band's releases, although Fontsere left in 2005, rejoined in 2009 & left again in 2022. The band's current lineup consists of Jericho, Ward, second guitarist Billy Grey, bassist P. J. Farley and drummer Grant Brooks. Jericho has characterized the band by saying, "If Metallica and Black Sabbath had a bastard child, it would be Fozzy." As of September 2022, the band has released eight studio albums and one live album. Their first two albums consist of primarily cover songs with some original material, while their albums since have made original material the primary focus.

History

Formation (1999–2000)
Fozzy started as Fozzy Osbourne, a play on the name of the singer Ozzy Osbourne, and was a cover band assembled by Ward from whatever musicians he could find in a given week. In 1999, Jericho and Ward met in San Antonio, Texas, after a wrestling show and Jericho was invited to play with the band. Their first show was held at the now-defunct club "The Hangar", in the downtown square of Marietta, Georgia. Jericho sat in on a few sessions, but did not plan to play with them permanently. In 2000, Jericho rejoined the band and became its frontman under the persona of Moongoose McQueen, and the band went on tour. As part of the band's "gimmick", Jericho refused to acknowledge that Moongoose McQueen and Chris Jericho were the same person. When interviewed as Moongoose, he would stay in character the whole time and even feign ignorance of who Chris Jericho was. On the other side, Chris Jericho was a "huge fan" of Moongoose and Fozzy.

Fozzy and Happenstance (2000–2002)
The band shortened its name to Fozzy, and adopted the satirical back-story that they had signed with a record company to move to Japan to be huge rock stars, but the company went out of business, leaving them stranded for 20 years, while all their demos were snatched and recorded by other bands. Soon afterward, Fozzy produced their first album, self-titled and featuring mostly covers of bands such as Dio, Krokus, Twisted Sister, Iron Maiden, Mötley Crüe and Judas Priest. Also, at one time the band considered changing their name to Big City Knights.

Fozzy's second album, Happenstance, was produced in 2002, again with mostly covers of bands such as Black Sabbath, Scorpions, W.A.S.P. and Accept.

All That Remains (2003–2006)

After the Happenstance tour ended in 2003, the band dropped its back-story and Chris Jericho's McQueen persona. In January 2005, they released their third album, All That Remains, which had entirely original tracks, including the singles "Enemy", "It's a Lie", "Born of Anger", and "The Test". All That Remains included guest appearances by musicians Zakk Wylde (Black Label Society, Ozzy Osbourne, Pride & Glory), Bone Crusher, Mark Tremonti (Creed, Alter Bridge), Myles Kennedy (Alter Bridge, Slash), Marty Friedman (Megadeth) and  Butch Walker (Marvelous 3). The album sold over 100,000 copies. In 2005, "Enemy" was the theme song for WWE No Way Out and in 2006 for a promotional video for TNA Bound for Glory. In 2005, the band played the Download Festival at Donington Park, England.

Chasing the Grail (2009–2011)
Soon after the release of All That Remains, a fourth album was announced.

On March 4, 2009, MetalUnderground.com reported that Fozzy had signed a worldwide record deal with Australian-based Riot! Entertainment to release their fourth album, Chasing the Grail. The album's lead single, "Martyr No More", was announced as an official theme song for the WWE Royal Rumble pay per view. The album was released in America on January 26, 2010, followed by Australia (February) and Europe (March).

On February 19, 2011, Jericho said during an interview with Active Rock radio station WBSX in Wilkes-Barre, Pennsylvania, that he had completed lyrics for a brand new Fozzy album and that Ward was beginning work on writing the music. The band hoped to have the new album released in February 2012. According to Fozzy's official Facebook page, the recordings were done on May 4, 2012. Fozzy released a brand new music video on June 7, which was shot at the Golden Gods Awards for the track "God Pounds His Nails". On July 10, Fozzy played the Sonisphere Festival at Knebworth, England. A special, two-CD edition of Fozzy's live album Remains Alive was released with Chasing the Grail on July 18. The band then announced a headlining tour of the United Kingdom for November 2011.

On September 9, Sean Delson announced his "retirement" from Fozzy as their bass guitar player to resume work with Agent Cooper. Fozzy announced Paul Di Leo, the bass guitarist for Adrenaline Mob, as his replacement.

Sin and Bones (2012–2013)
On January 18, 2010, it was announced that Fozzy had signed with Century Media Records, and planned to release a new album later in the year. Jericho hinted the new album on his Twitter page, saying, 'New @FOZZYROCK album in August?!'. Jericho recently made a full-time return to the WWE on January 4, but despite this, Fozzy was announced to be a part of the Download Festival in the UK, in the summer. On July 17, Fozzy released the first single from their fifth studio album, Sin and Bones, titled "Sandpaper". The song features guest vocals by M. Shadows from Avenged Sevenfold and was also the Hell in a Cell theme song. Sin and Bones was released on August 14. Shortly after the album's release, Chris Jericho once again left the WWE with his final appearance being on SmackDown, on August 20, so that he could go on tour with the band. Fozzy played on the 2012 Uproar Festival tour, headlining the Jägermeister stage. After the Uproar Festival, Fozzy scheduled an international tour with stops in Europe and Australia. Fozzy made their return to the U.S. in 2013 touring as an opener for Saxon on the "Sacrifice and Sin" tour. One tour date (September 21, Joilet, Illinois) was rescheduled and became a Fozzy solo date on October 16.

Do You Wanna Start a War (2014–2015)

During 2013, it was confirmed that Fozzy would begin working on a new record in 2014 and would be looking for a release date during the summer of 2014. The band entered the studio in late January. The first single, "Lights Go Out", was released April 29. "Lights Go Out" reached number 29 on the Billboard Mainstream Rock Songs chart, becoming their first single to make it to the charts. Following the release of the new single, the band embarked on the "Lights Go Out" tour to promote their new album, playing festivals such as Carolina Rebellion, Rock on the Range, and Download, where they performed on the main stage for the first time in the band's history. The second single, "One Crazed Anarchist", was released on May 26, 2014, and was given away to people that pre-ordered the album. The album, Do You Wanna Start a War, was released on July 21 in the UK and Europe and July 22 in North America. The album also features guest appearances by Christie Cook and Steel Panther's Michael Starr. In September 2014, the band announced that Jeff Rouse would be their new bassist, as Paul Di Leo mutually parted ways with the band in May.

Judas (2016–2018)
Jericho confirmed that Fozzy hoped to have their seventh studio album written by January 2016. As of December 2015, the band had started working on the record and hoped to have a release date sometime in summer 2016. However, Jericho said in an interview that it was unlikely to be released in 2016 and was more likely to be released in 2017; this could be due to his return as a full-time WWE in-ring competitor.

On March 18, 2017, Jericho announced that Paul Di Leo had rejoined Fozzy on his Instagram page, replacing Randy Drake as the bassist.

On April 26, 2017, the band released a short snippet of their new single and music video titled "Judas", which premiered on Loudwire on May 2. "Judas" would later become one of the official theme songs for WWE's NXT TakeOver: Chicago, as well as Jericho's theme song in New Japan Pro-Wrestling and All Elite Wrestling. "Judas" instantly became a hit for the band, receiving over 30 million views on YouTube, and reaching number one on various charts worldwide, including reaching number 5 on the Billboard Mainstream Rock Songs, their highest charting position for a single. The band embarked on a show tour in May–June 2017.

Guitarist Rich Ward revealed in an interview with Blabbermouth that the album would be released in September 2017 and is also titled Judas. The album release date was revealed on Jericho's official Instagram account: Judas was released on October 13, 2017. After extensive touring through 2017 - 2018, Paul Di Leo would again part ways and again be replaced with Randy Drake for the remainder of the 2018 Judas tour, including Fozzy playing at Jericho's Rock'N'Wrestling Rager at Sea.
On October 22, 2017, Fozzy played at the Aftershock Festival in Sacramento, California.

Boombox (2019–present)
On April 4, 2019, Fozzy announced that they were signing with Sony Music. Following this, they announced they had entered the studio to begin recording of their eighth studio album, later tentatively named as 2020 due for release in 2020. Chris Jericho debuted the album's first single, "Nowhere to Run" during a broadcast of The Rock of Jericho on August 23. "Nowhere to Run" was later released on August 29, 2019. However, in July 2020, Chris Jericho said the album's title had been scrapped, and the release was pushed to 2021. "The original idea was to call it '2020', until we realized that we're not gonna have this thing done till November/December, so it's not as contemporary anymore to put out an album called '2020' when it's 2021. Let's just leave it behind." The album, re-titled Boombox, was eventually released on May 6, 2022.

Members

Current members
Chris Jericho/Chris Irvine – lead vocals 
Rich Ward – lead guitar, keyboards, programming, backing vocals 
Billy Grey – rhythm guitar, backing vocals 
P. J. Farley – bass, backing vocals 
Grant Brooks – drums

Discography

Studio albums
 Fozzy (2000)
 Happenstance (2002)
 All That Remains (2005)
 Chasing the Grail (2010)
 Sin and Bones (2012)
 Do You Wanna Start a War (2014)
 Judas (2017)
 Boombox (2022)

Awards
Loudwire Music Awards

|-
| 2012 || Sandpaper (featuring M. Shadows) || Cage Match Hall of Fame ||

Notes

References

External links
 

1999 establishments in Georgia (U.S. state)
Century Media Records artists
 
Heavy metal musical groups from Georgia (U.S. state)
Musical groups established in 1999
Musical quintets